The flag of Melilla, a Spanish enclave in North Africa, consists of a pale blue background with the city's coat of arms in the centre. The flag is adopted on 13 March 1995 when Melilla became an autonomous city of Spain.

See also 
Coat of arms of Melilla

Flags of cities in Spain
Flag
Flags displaying animals
Flags introduced in 1995